β-lactam antibiotics (beta-lactam antibiotics) are antibiotics that contain a beta-lactam ring in their chemical
structure. This includes penicillin derivatives (penams), cephalosporins and cephamycins (cephems), monobactams, carbapenems and carbacephems. Most β-lactam antibiotics work by inhibiting cell wall biosynthesis in the bacterial organism and are the most widely used group of antibiotics. Until 2003, when measured by sales, more than half of all commercially available antibiotics in use were β-lactam compounds. The first β-lactam antibiotic discovered, penicillin, was isolated from a strain of Penicillium rubens (named as Penicillium notatum at the time).

Bacteria often develop resistance to β-lactam antibiotics by synthesizing a β-lactamase, an enzyme that attacks the β-lactam ring. To overcome this resistance, β-lactam antibiotics can be given with β-lactamase inhibitors such as clavulanic acid.

Medical use
β-lactam antibiotics are indicated for the prevention and treatment of bacterial infections caused by susceptible organisms. At first, β-lactam antibiotics were mainly active only against Gram-positive bacteria, yet the recent development of broad-spectrum β-lactam antibiotics active against various Gram-negative organisms has increased their usefulness.

In uninflamed (normal) brain meninges, the penetration of beta-lactam antibiotics is low, at 0.15 of AUCCSF/AUCS ratio (the ratio of area under curve of cerebrosopinal fluid against area under curve of serum).

Adverse effects

Adverse drug reactions
Common adverse drug reactions for the β-lactam antibiotics include diarrhea, nausea, rash, urticaria, superinfection (including candidiasis).

Infrequent adverse effects include fever, vomiting, erythema, dermatitis, angioedema, pseudomembranous colitis.

Pain and inflammation at the injection site is also common for parenterally administered β-lactam antibiotics.

Allergy/hypersensitivity
Immunologically mediated adverse reactions to any β-lactam antibiotic may occur in up to 10% of patients receiving that agent (a small fraction of which are truly IgE-mediated allergic reactions, see amoxicillin rash). Anaphylaxis will occur in approximately 0.01% of patients. There is perhaps a 5–10% cross-sensitivity between penicillin-derivatives, cephalosporins, and carbapenems; but this figure has been challenged by various investigators.

Nevertheless, the risk of cross-reactivity is sufficient to warrant the contraindication of all β-lactam antibiotics in patients with a history of severe allergic reactions (urticaria, anaphylaxis, interstitial nephritis) to any β-lactam antibiotic.  Rarely, allergic reactions have been triggered by exposure from kissing and sexual contact with a partner who is taking these antibiotics.

A Jarisch–Herxheimer reaction may occur after initial treatment of a spirochetal infection such as syphilis with a β-lactam antibiotic.

Mechanism of action

Inhibition of cell wall synthesis

β-lactam antibiotics are bactericidal, and act by inhibiting the synthesis of the peptidoglycan layer of bacterial cell walls. The peptidoglycan layer is important for cell wall structural integrity, especially in Gram-positive organisms, being the outermost and primary component of the wall. The final transpeptidation step in the synthesis of the peptidoglycan is facilitated by DD-transpeptidases, also known as penicillin binding proteins (PBPs). PBPs vary in their affinity for penicillin and other β-lactam antibiotics. The number of PBPs varies between bacterial species.

β-lactam antibiotics are analogues of -alanyl--alanine—the terminal amino acid residues on the precursor NAM/NAG-peptide subunits of the nascent peptidoglycan layer. The structural similarity between β-lactam antibiotics and -alanyl--alanine facilitates their binding to the active site of PBPs. The β-lactam nucleus of the molecule irreversibly binds to (acylates) the Ser403 residue of the PBP active site. This irreversible inhibition of the PBPs prevents the final crosslinking (transpeptidation) of the nascent peptidoglycan layer, disrupting cell wall synthesis.
β-lactam antibiotics block not only the division of bacteria, including cyanobacteria, but also the division of cyanelles, the photosynthetic organelles of the glaucophytes, and the division of chloroplasts of bryophytes. In contrast, they have no effect on the plastids of the highly developed vascular plants. This is supporting the endosymbiotic theory and indicates an evolution of plastid division in land plants.

Under normal circumstances, peptidoglycan precursors signal a reorganisation of the bacterial cell wall and, as a consequence, trigger the activation of autolytic cell wall hydrolases. Inhibition of cross-linkage by β-lactams causes a build-up of peptidoglycan precursors, which triggers the digestion of existing peptidoglycan by autolytic hydrolases without the production of new peptidoglycan. As a result, the bactericidal action of β-lactam antibiotics is further enhanced.

Guanine oxidation

Another possibility that has been proposed to account for much of the cytotoxicity of beta lactams focuses on the oxidation of the guanine nucleotide in the bacterial nucleotide pool.  The incorporation of oxidized guanine nucleotide into DNA could cause cytotoxicity.  Bacterial cytotoxicity could arise from incomplete repair of closely spaced 8-oxo-2'-deoxyguanosine lesions  in the DNA resulting in double-strand breaks.

Potency

Two structural features of β-lactam antibiotics have been correlated with their antibiotic potency. The first is known as "Woodward's parameter", h, and is the height (in angstroms) of the pyramid formed by the nitrogen atom of the β-lactam as the apex and the three adjacent carbon atoms as the base. The second is called "Cohen's parameter", c, and is the distance between the carbon atom of the carboxylate and the oxygen atom of the β-lactam carbonyl. This distance is thought to correspond to the distance between the carboxylate-binding site and the oxyanion hole of the PBP enzyme. The best antibiotics are those with higher h values (more reactive to hydrolysis) and lower c values (better binding to PBPs).

Modes of resistance
By definition, all β-lactam antibiotics have a β-lactam ring in their structure.  The effectiveness of these antibiotics relies on their ability to reach the PBP intact and their ability to bind to the PBP.  Hence, there are two main modes of bacterial resistance to β-lactams:

Enzymatic hydrolysis of the β-lactam ring
If the bacterium produces the enzyme β-lactamase or the enzyme penicillinase, the enzyme will hydrolyse the β-lactam ring of the antibiotic, rendering the antibiotic ineffective. (An example of such an enzyme is New Delhi metallo-beta-lactamase 1, discovered in 2009.) The genes encoding these enzymes may be inherently present on the bacterial chromosome or may be acquired via plasmid transfer (plasmid-mediated resistance), and β-lactamase gene expression may be induced by exposure to β-lactams.

The production of a β-lactamase by a bacterium does not necessarily rule out all treatment options with β-lactam antibiotics.  In some instances, β-lactam antibiotics may be co-administered with a β-lactamase inhibitor. For example, Augmentin (FGP) is made of amoxicillin (a β-lactam antibiotic) and clavulanic acid (a β-lactamase inhibitor). The clavulanic acid is designed to overwhelm all β-lactamase enzymes, and effectively serve as an antagonist so that the amoxicillin is not affected by the β-lactamase enzymes. Another β-lactam/β-lactamase inhibitor combination is piperacillin/tazobactam with a broad spectrum of antibacterial activity that includes Gram-positive and -negative aerobic and anaerobic bacteria. The addition of tazobactam to piperacillin has enhanced its stability against a wide range of β-lactamase enzymes including some Extended-Spectrum β-lactamases.

Other β-lactamase inhibitors such as boronic acids are being studied in which they irreversibly bind to the active site of β-lactamases. This is a benefit over clavulanic acid and similar beta-lactam competitors, because they cannot be hydrolysed, and therefore rendered useless. Extensive research is currently being done to develop tailored boronic acids to target different isozymes of beta-lactamases.

However, in all cases where infection with β-lactamase-producing bacteria is suspected, the choice of a suitable β-lactam antibiotic should be carefully considered prior to treatment.  In particular, choosing appropriate β-lactam antibiotic therapy is of utmost importance against organisms which harbor some level of β-lactamase expression.  In this case, failure to use the most appropriate β-lactam antibiotic therapy at the onset of treatment could result in selection for bacteria with higher levels of β-lactamase expression, thereby making further efforts with other β-lactam antibiotics more difficult.

Possession of altered penicillin-binding proteins
As a response to the use of β-lactams to control bacterial infections, some bacteria have evolved penicillin binding proteins with novel structures. β-lactam antibiotics cannot bind as effectively to these altered PBPs, and, as a result, the β-lactams are less effective at disrupting cell wall synthesis. Notable examples of this mode of resistance include methicillin-resistant Staphylococcus aureus (MRSA) and penicillin-resistant Streptococcus pneumoniae.  Altered PBPs do not necessarily rule out all treatment options with β-lactam antibiotics.

Nomenclature

β-lactams are classified according to their core ring structures.
 β-lactams fused to saturated five-membered rings:
 β-lactams containing thiazolidine rings are named penams.
 β-lactams containing pyrrolidine rings are named carbapenams.
 β-lactams fused to oxazolidine rings are named oxapenams or clavams.
 β-lactams fused to unsaturated five-membered rings:
 β-lactams containing 2,3-dihydrothiazole rings are named penems.
 β-lactams containing 2,3-dihydro-1H-pyrrole rings are named carbapenems.
 β-lactams fused to unsaturated six-membered rings:
 β-lactams containing 3,6-dihydro-2H-1,3-thiazine rings are named cephems.
 β-lactams containing 1,2,3,4-tetrahydropyridine rings are named carbacephems.
 β-lactams containing 3,6-dihydro-2H-1,3-oxazine rings are named oxacephems.
 β-lactams not fused to any other ring are named monobactams.

By convention, the bicyclic β-lactams are numbered starting with the position occupied by sulfur in the penams and cephems, regardless of which atom it is in a given class. That is, position 1 is always adjacent to the β-carbon of β-lactam ring. The numbering continues clockwise from position one until the β-carbon of β-lactam is reached, at which point numbering continues counterclockwise around the lactam ring to number the remaining to carbons. For example, the nitrogen atom of all bicyclic β-lactams fused to five-membered rings is labelled position 4, as it is in penams, while in cephems, the nitrogen is position 5.

The numbering of monobactams follows that of the IUPAC; the nitrogen atom is position 1, the carbonyl carbon is 2, the α-carbon is 3, and the β-carbon 4.

Biosynthesis
To date, two distinct methods of biosynthesizing the β-lactam core of this family of antibiotics have been discovered. The first pathway discovered was that of the penams and cephems. This path begins with a  nonribosomal peptide synthetase (NRPS), ACV synthetase (ACVS), which generates the linear tripeptide δ-(L-α-aminoadipyl)-L-cysteine-D-valine (ACV). ACV is oxidatively cyclized (two cyclizations by a single enzyme) to bicyclic intermediate isopenicillin N by isopenicillin N synthase (IPNS) to form the penam core structure. Various transamidations lead to the different natural penicillins.

The biosynthesis of cephems branch off at isopenicillin N by an oxidative ring expansion to the cephem core. As with the penams, the variety of cephalosporins and cephamycins come from different transamidations, as is the case for the penicillins.

While the ring closure in penams and cephems is between positions 1 and 4 of the β-lactam and is oxidative, the clavams and carbapenems have their rings closed by two-electron processes between positions 1 and 2 of the ring. β-lactam synthetases are responsible for these cyclizations, and the carboxylate of the open-ring substrates is activated by ATP. In clavams, the β-lactam is formed prior to the second ring; in carbapenems, the β-lactam ring is closed second in sequence.

The biosynthesis of the β-lactam ring of tabtoxin mirrors that of the clavams and carbapenems. The closure of the lactam ring in the other monobactams, such as sulfazecin and the nocardicins, may involve a third mechanism involving inversion of configuration at the β-carbon.

See also
 List of β-lactam antibiotics
 ATC code J01C Beta-lactam antibacterials, penicillins
 ATC code J01D Other beta-lactam antibacterials
 Bacteria
 Cell wall
 Discovery and development of cephalosporins
 History of penicillin
 Nitrocefin

References

 
Nephrotoxins